The 1996 season is the 74th season of competitive football in Ecuador.

National leagues

Serie A
Champion: El Nacional (11th title)
International cup qualifiers:
1997 Copa Libertadores: El Nacional, Emelec
1997 Copa CONMEBOL: Técnico Universitario
Relegated: Green Cross, LDU Portoviejo

Serie B
Winner: Deportivo Quevedo (2nd title)
Promoted: Deportivo Quevedo, Calvi
Relegated: LDU Loja, Imbabura

Segunda
Winner: Macará
Promoted: Macará, Esmeraldas Petrolero

Clubs in international competitions

National teams

Senior team
The Ecuador national team played seventeen matches in 1996: six 1998 FIFA World Cup qualifiers and eleven friendlies.

1998 FIFA World Cup qualifiers

Qualification to the 1998 FIFA World Cup in France began in 1996.

Friendlies

Note: This is not an official international friendly.

External links
 National leagues details on RSSSF

 
1996